James Hall (April 9, 1802August 31, 1889) was an American physician who founded the colony of Maryland-in-Africa. Hall served as its governor from 1833 to 1836.

Early life and education
James Hall was born on April 9, 1802, in Cornish, New Hampshire, to parents Nathaniel and Prudence Hall. James studied medicine with Dr. Nathan Smith, and later attended the Medical School of Maine. He graduated with an M.D. in 1822. He practiced medicine in Claremont, New Hampshire, as well as Windsor, Vermont, until 1829, when rheumatism caused James to lose partial use of his left leg, which necessitated the use of a crutch and cane for the rest of his life. He later spent time in the West Indies.

Maryland-in-Africa
In 1831, Hall sailed to Liberia with a group of colonists. There he served as colonial physician for two years, after which he returned to the United States. In 1833, the Maryland State Colonization Society commissioned Hall to establish a new Liberian colony at Cape Palmas. Hall did so, and served as governor of the colony of Maryland-in-Africa from October 1833 until his resignation in July 1836. After his resignation, he returned to the United States. Hall continued work with the Maryland State Colonization Society, as a general agent, as well as with the American Colonization Society, as a commercial agent, from 1840 to 1861. The colony Hall founded gained independence in 1854, but was annexed by Liberia in 1857. In 1877, Hall donated the organization papers of the Maryland State Colonization Society to the Maryland Historical Society.

Personal life
Hall married Caroline Matilda on October 31, 1825, in Charlestown, New Hampshire. Together they had two children. Caroline died in 1829.

Later life and death
Hall spent his retirement in Elkridge, Maryland. Hall there died on August 31, 1889. He was interred in Green Mount Cemetery.

References 

1802 births
1889 deaths
American politicians with disabilities
American expatriates in Liberia
American colonization movement
Governors of the Republic of Maryland
People from Cornish, New Hampshire
People from Baltimore County, Maryland
Medical School of Maine alumni
Burials at Green Mount Cemetery
Physicians from Maryland
19th-century American physicians